Jon Thompson may refer to:
 Jon Thompson (artist), British artist, curator and academic
 Jon Thompson (civil servant), British civil servant
 Jon W. Thompson, American judge

See also
 Jonathan Thompson (disambiguation)
 John Thompson (disambiguation)